Sea bean may refer to:

Drift seed, a seed of any of a number of tropical plants growing in coastal areas, the seeds of which are found floating upon ocean currents, by means of which the seeds are dispersed.
Mucuna gigantea, a tropical species of liana dispersed in this way.
When used in a culinary context, several different plants of the genus Salicornia which are used as vegetables